Ebchester is a village in County Durham, England. It is situated to the north of Consett and to the south east of Whittonstall.
The village sits at the intersection of the A694, which runs from Consett to Swalwell, and the B6309, which connects the A696 north of Belsay and runs into the A691 immediately south of the village of Leadgate.

Etymology
Chester derives from the Old English word for a Roman fortification. There have been some attempts to identify the first element with a Roman place-name, but on the available evidence it is safest to regard it as coming from an Old English personal name Ebba, thus 'Ebba's fortification'. It is possible that the ‘Ebba’ element refers to Æbbe (c. 615 – 683) who was an Anglian abbess and noblewoman. Æbbe was the daughter of Æthelfrith, who was king of Bernicia from c. 593 to 616. Æbbe founded monasteries at Ebchester and St Abb's Head near Coldingham in Scotland. At Coldingham it is thought she founded her monastery in the remains of a 6th century fort. If the same was true at what is now known as Ebchester, this could explain the name Ebba’s fortification.

History

It is thought that the church of St Ebba was originally a monastery founded about this time by Æbbe of Coldingham, the daughter of Æthelfrith, the first king of Northumbria. Ebba soon moved on to be abbess of Coldingham, where she died in 683. The monastery was destroyed by Danish invaders.
Consequently, there are no remains of this date, and the present church was mainly built in the early 11th century, using stone re-used from the Roman fort. The parish church is dedicated to St. Ebba, being of partly Norman construction with a foundation, described as being pre-Conquest. Much of the stone in the walls and doorway had been taken from Roman rubble of the fort of Vindomora, on which most of the village is located.

The church was restored in 1876 and a vestry was added in 1893 at the church's north-west end.  It stands in the southern corner of the site of the fort.  There has been relatively little research on the fort, though it is known that a simple mosaic was found here in the 1950s.  Several Roman altars and other carved stones are known from the site of the church. 

Until the creation of the separate parish of Shotley Bridge in the 19th century, many people from there were christened, married and buried in St. Ebba's Church. Quite notably, these include many of the sword-makers from Shotley Bridge of which perhaps the most notable is the monument of Joseph Oley, which reads "The last of the Shotley Bridge swordmakers" and can be found in the churchyard. Many memorials inside the church refer to the Surtees family.

Ebchester Hall (an 18th-century house with 19th century additions) is now St. Mary's Convent and old people's home served by the Order of the Good and Perpetual Succour.

The fort was known by the Roman name of Vindomora, but sadly there is now little to be seen as most of the site has been built over. 
Although the fort went out of use by the end of the 4th century, it is probable that the site was reused again in the 7th century.
During the medieval period the area remained rural. The isolated, yet attractive, landscape encouraged many hermits to come here and the area was once known as the 'place of the anchorites'. 
The River Derwent itself played an important part in the history of the village. Several water-powered mills are recorded in the 18th and 19th century. A corn mill stood at Mill Lane, and a fulling mill and a Stick mill are also known. Several bridges are also known. As well as the surviving bridges, a wooden bridge once stood, as did another footbridge, though both have now disappeared.

The rural nature of the village continued throughout the post-medieval period and through to the present day. The remains of several post-medieval buildings still survive today, such as Demesne Farm and West Law and the large St Mary's Convent, formerly called Ebchester Hall.

Ebchester is also the location of a curious ghost story. The tale tells that in the early 18th century a local gentleman Robert Johnson had a row with his son and swore an oath, saying 'I hope my right arm will burn off before I give my son a sixpence'. He soon made up with his son, and many years later when he was on his deathbed, he left all his land and property to him. This would all have been quite unremarkable, except for events which occurred before the funeral. The house was full of guests paying their last respects, and the body lay in a coffin in the front room. Suddenly they smelt burning, and on investigation they found that it came from the coffin. They opened the lid and found, that as he had sworn, Robert Johnson's arm was burning off!

Notable people from Ebchester
Denise Welch, actress (Coronation Street and Waterloo Road) and TV presenter (Loose Women).

References

 
Villages in County Durham
Consett